Simla is the former name of Shimla, a city in the Indian state of Himachal Pradesh.

Simla may also refer to:

Places
 Simla district, now Shimla district, a district of Himachal Paradesh around the city
 Simla (Lok Sabha constituency), now Shimla, a parliamentary constituency in Himachal Pradesh
 A name given to the William Beebe Tropical Research Station in Trinidad and Tobago, now operated by the Asa Wright Nature Centre
 Simla, Colorado, a town in Colorado, United States
 An electoral ward in Lautoka, Fiji
 Simla Junction, California, a historic location in Los Altos, California, United States
 Simla, West Bengal, a census town in Hooghly district in the Indian state of

People
 Shimla (actress), a Bangladeshi film actress.